St. Mary's Forane Church, Chalakudy, is one of the 10 Foranes or deaneries under the Syro-Malabar Catholic Eparchy of Irinjalakuda, which was established in 1978 by the bifurcation of Thrissur Diocese. Prior to that, Chalakudy was part of Thrissur diocese, the most ancient Diocese of the Syro-Malabar Catholic Church. Thrissur diocese has since been elevated to an archdiocese, Syro-Malabar Catholic Archeparchy of Thrissur, within which comes the Irinjalakuda diocese. There are 16 parishes under the Chalakudy Forane. The people of Chalakudy, mainly in business or service sectors, belong to middle or upper-middle-class families. Chalakudy is one of those areas in Kerala with a high concentration of Christian population, most belonging to the Syro-Malabar Catholic Church.

History
The origin of Christian faith in Chalakudy is claimed to date from the time when St. Thomas the Apostle, one of the twelve apostles of Jesus Christ, set foot in India with his mission shortly after Jesus's death. According to tradition, Apostle Thomas landed in Kodungallur, formerly known as Musiris, in 52 AD. At that time Kodungallur was a busy commercial center and an important port. St. Thomas travelled about various parts of Kerala preaching the Gospel and forming Christian communities, which began to grow at several places. The early Christian community in Chalakudy, who had been converted by Thomas, established the parish and built their first church in 600 AD. The church was built in an area predominantly occupied by Brahmins, who the granted permission to build the church there. The town has people of several religions, who live in harmony. The church was then in the Palace Road, where it remained until about 1300 AD, when it moved to its present site a few hundred meters away.

The intercession of Blessed Virgin Mary is claimed to have taken place long ago. The original altar is known as "Swayamvara Altar", a title sparingly bestowed by the Pope. It is said that those who pray at this altar with complete self-surrender will receive special blessings. In 1937, the parish was elevated to the status of a Forane. The church was rebuilt in 1987 but the original intricately carved wooden altar was left intact. On the consecration of the remodelled church, Cardinal Lourdusamy declared it to be a Marian Pilgrim Centre. The colossal belfry built in gothic style almost a century ago with a huge statue of Mary on the top is the tallest structure in the vicinity.

In 1966, 432 families were delinked from the parish to form a new parish under the forane with its base at Our Lady of Perpetual Help Church, West Chalakudy.

Grotto
As being a Mariyan shrine the church witnessed huge devotion to Mother Mary. With the inspiration felt to the parish priest Rev. Fr. Thomas Panjikkaran, there was a plan to build a Grotto in reverence and devotion to Mother Mary.
In October 2000 a Marian Grotto was built in the church premises similar to the one in Lourdes. In October 2001 a Perpetual Adoration Centre was set up as a memorial of the silver jubilee of Irinjalakuda Diocese and the consecration of its first Bishop Mar James Pazhayattil. There is special prayers and novena happening in every Saturday at this Grotto. Many people who comes to Divine Retreat Centre visits the Grotto in this church. Hundreds of devotees come here daily to pray here.

Holy Land replica
The Holy Land replica was an idea arouse in the mind of Rev. Fr. Thomas Panjikkaran who was vicar of the parish. The intention is to give a feel of traveling around the real Holy Land in Israel and neighboring countries. The plan was to make the a walkway and around which all the important Holy Land places will be shown with models. With help of artists, it was accomplished in 2006. On completion of the construction, which took over 3 years, Cardinal Mar Varkey Vithayathil blessed the Holy Land on 8 September 2006 and the State Tourism & Home Minister Shri Kodiyeri Balakrishnan inaugurated it. Civil structures are built in ancient architectural styles to give as much resemblance to the originals as possible.

Beginning with the Old Testament incident of the bronze serpent put up by Moses the stations in the Holy Land depict all the important events from the life of Jesus, especially his birth, public ministry, passion, crucifixion, and believed resurrection & ascension, and concludes with the scene of his mother Mary being crowned as the Queen of heaven and earth. The Holy Land museum has display on several relics and other objects of religious and historical importance.

Feasts

St. Mary's Forane Church has two major feasts celebrated every year. The Mother Mary's feast and St. Sebastian's feast. Both the feasts are celebrated with a participation of large number of people in Chalakudy town and near by villages. There used to be huge procession around the town as a part of celebrations. There will be many exhibitions and programs in the town during the feasts. Mother Mary's Oottuthirunnaal is also a famous feast when blessed food is given to more than ten thousand people.

See also
 Pindi Perunnal

References

External links

 
 
 

Churches in Thrissur district
Buildings and structures in Chalakudy
Syro-Malabar Catholic church buildings
7th-century churches in India